Wawa is a town in northern Sudan near the Nile River, located at 20°26′N 30°21′E.

The town sits directly across the Nile River from the ancient city of Soleb 

Pebble tools from the early Stone Age have been found in this area including an early hand axe dating roughly 1.5 million to 200,000 years ago

References

Populated places in Northern (state)